Paley, Austin and Paley was the title of a practice of architects in Lancaster, Lancashire in the 19th century.  The practice had been founded in 1836 by Edmund Sharpe.  The architects during the period covered by this list are E. G. Paley, Hubert Austin and E. G. Paley's son Henry Paley.  Henry Paley became a partner in 1886 and this partnership continued until the death of E. G. Paley in 1895.

This list covers the works executed by the practice during the partnership of Paley, Austin and Paley.  Because of the location of the practice, most of their ecclesiastical work was in the areas that are now Cumbria, Lancashire, and Greater Manchester, but examples can also be found in Cheshire, Merseyside, Yorkshire, Worcestershire and the West Midlands.

Key

Works

References
Citations

Sources

 

Gothic Revival architecture
Paley, Austin and Paley